Cheshmeh Teymuri (also Romanized as Cheshmeh Teymūrī, Cheshmeh-ye Teymūrī, Chashmeh-i-Timūri, and Cheshmeh Teimoori) is a village in Salehabad Rural District, Salehabad County, Razavi Khorasan Province, Iran. At the 2006 census, its population was 238, in 56 families.

References 

Populated places in   Torbat-e Jam County